Westworld: Season 3 is the third soundtrack of the American television series Westworld, composed by Ramin Djawadi. Released on May 3, 2020, the day the season finale aired,  the album includes 29 pieces composed for the show. Like the previous soundtracks, the soundtrack features original compositions by Djawadi and also many cover versions of modern songs, featuring covers of Massive Attack, Gun N' Roses, Moses Sumney, Björk, The Weeknd, David Bowie and Pink Floyd, while also featuring a cover of The Shining's main theme by Wendy Carlos and Rachel Elkind.

Reception 
The soundtrack received positive reviews from critics. Prahlad Srihari from Firstpost commented: "Occupying that nebulous zone between soundtrack and score, the Westworld music destined to endure will inevitably be Djawadi's covers. Stylistic gimmicks or not, these covers are infectiously catchy, and arguably boast a higher replay value than the series itself." Alec Bojalad from Den of Geek stated: "The Westworld soundtrack quickly became partially defined by its minimalist piano covers of modern pop songs." Jesse Schedeen from the IGN gave a positive review by stating: "Either way, whether you prefer your HBO dramas full of swords and dragons or psychologically tortured androids, Djawadi has the right music for any occasion."

Track listing 
All music by Ramin Djawadi, except where noted.

Charts

References 

2020 soundtrack albums
Ramin Djawadi soundtracks
Television soundtracks
WaterTower Music soundtracks
Soundtrack 02